Sylvacaecilia is a monotypic genus of caecilian in the family Grandisoniidae.   The only species is Sylvacaecilia grandisonae, also known as the Aleku caecilian or Ethiopian caecilian. It is endemic to southwestern Ethiopia and known from the Gambela, Oromia, and Southern Nations, Nationalities, and Peoples' Regions.

Taxonomy
Sylvacaecilia grandisonae was described by Edward Harrison Taylor in 1970 as Geotrypetes grandisonae, although he noted that the generic assignment was provisional. Because of significant differences in morphology and life history in comparison to other Geotrypetes species, it was moved to its own, monotypic genus Sylvacaecilia by Marvalee Wake in 1987.

Etymology
The generic name Sylvacaecilia is derived from Greek sylva, referring to the forest habitat of these animals, and Latin caecilia, in reference to the taxon. The specific name grandisonae honours Miss Alice G. C. Grandison, a Curator of Herpetology at Natural History Museum, London and whom Taylor acknowledges as having been "helpful in providing these specimens for study".

Description
The body is relatively thick, with body width in length approximately 24 times.

Sylvacaecilia grandisonae has free-living larval stage.

Habitat and conservation
Adults live in soil or mud and under leaf-litter. Larvae have been found in very wet mud at the edge of a stream. No major threats are known, although habitat disturbance could still be an issue. It occurs in the Kafa Biosphere Reserve.

References

Indotyphlidae
Monotypic amphibian genera
Amphibians of Ethiopia
Endemic fauna of Ethiopia
Taxa named by Edward Harrison Taylor
Amphibians described in 1970
Taxonomy articles created by Polbot